Always Outnumbered (also known as Always Outnumbered, Always Outgunned) is a television film based on the novel Always Outnumbered, Always Outgunned by author Walter Mosley. It first aired on pay television channel HBO in 1998.

Plot
The film stars Laurence Fishburne as aging ex-con Socrates Fortlow, who after a long incarceration, is trying hard to make a new life and to accept the regrets of his past. Meanwhile, he meets a young boy named Darryl, who witnessed a boy murdered by a friend of his. He also has to deal with his best friend's deteriorating health and finding work.

Cast
 Laurence Fishburne - Socrates Fortlow
 Bill Cobbs - Right Burke
 Natalie Cole - Iula Brown
 Daniel Williams - Darryl
 Cicely Tyson - Luvia
 Laurie Metcalf - Halley Grimes
 Bill Nunn - Howard M'Shalla
 Bridgid Coulter - Corina M'Shalla
 Isaiah Washington - Wilfred
 Bill Duke - Blackbird Willis
 Kevin Carroll - Pegus
 Jamaal Carter - Phillip
 John Toles-Bey - Stoney Wiley
 Brooke Marie Bridges - Winnie M'Shalla
 John Gavigan - Mr. Keene
 Perry Moore - Kiko
 Sammi Rotibi - Marlow Bitta
 Art Evans - Markham Peale
 Danny Goldring - Parker
 Dan Martin - Weems
 Paula Jai Parker - Melodie

See also 
 List of hood films

External links
 

Films based on American novels
HBO Films films
1998 television films
1998 films
1998 drama films
Films directed by Michael Apted
Hood films
1990s American films